Teolinda Gersão (born 1940) is a Portuguese writer.

Born in Coimbra, she studied at the universities of Coimbra, Tübingen and Berlin. She also taught at the Technical University of Berlin, Lisbon University, and the Universidade de Lisboa, among others. A full-time writer since the mid-1990s, Gersao is the author of more than a dozen books. She has won several literary prizes for her work. Her novel The Word Tree set in colonial Mozambique, was translated into English by Margaret Jull Costa.

References

1940 births
Living people
People from Coimbra
21st-century Portuguese women writers
20th-century Portuguese women writers
20th-century Portuguese writers
21st-century Portuguese writers